Popcorn is a 2007 British romantic comedy film written and directed by Darren Paul Fisher. It was filmed in 2005 at one of London's largest multiplex cinemas, Odeon Greenwich.

Plot
Too insecure to approach the girl of his dreams, Danny takes a job at his local movie house where she works, only to learn his first day is her last. After his initial efforts to woo her fail, he resorts to drastic measures by enlisting the help of the chief projectionist, a man who no longer knows the difference between the real and the film worlds.

Cast
Jack Ryder as Danny
Jodi Albert as Suki 
Luke de Woolfson as Zak 
Colette Brown as Florence 
Andrew Lee Potts as Kris 
Kate Maberly as Annie
Laura Aikman as Jeannie
Layke Anderson as Cool Guy 
Sophie Anderton as Female Killer 
Kacey Barnfield as Yukino Girl 
Chike Chan as Lo

Soundtrack
Little Voice - Performed by Mohair
Burn It Up - Performed by Hardwire
Undertow - Performed by Wade
Love Is A Wonderful Thing - Performed by Sarah Lundbeck
Dynamite - Performed by China Doll
Time To Get It On - Performed by Mista Groove featuring Joneice Jamieson
Round And Round - Performed by LJ
Thin Air - Performed by Mohair
Hypnotised - Performed by Solasso featuring Foster Child
Number One Or Zero - Performed by Toffee

Reviews
Matthew Leyland from the BBC gives it two out of five stars, saying that "few of the jokes hit the target" and the "leads were dull." He acknowledges the film's ambition, which uses "slapstick, sight gags, sound gags (movie dialogue finishing characters' sentences) and manga-esque inserts."  Anna Smith from Empire Magazine also gave the film a negative review, rating it one out of five. She states that Popcorn is "a well-meaning British comedy that fails to deliver the laughs – or the romance." Paul Newman's blog review pointed to a positive aspect of the film, in that it doesn't follow the typical Hollywood format, but "feels more like an indy comedy."

Manga style artwork
The film makes use of manga-style artwork and comic strips by United Kingdom resident Original English-language manga artist Sonia Leong of Sweatdrop Studios. The artwork is used as both posters in one of the character's rooms, and as illustrations in the plot.

References

External links

2007 romantic comedy films
2000s teen comedy films
2000s teen romance films
British romantic comedy films
British teen comedy films
British teen romance films
Films set in a movie theatre
Films set in London
Films shot in London
Films scored by Paul Leonard-Morgan
2000s English-language films
2000s British films